The Company and Securities Law Journal is a peer-reviewed law journal published in Australia since 1982.

The general editors are Bob Baxt (founding editor) and Dr Paul Ali. The editorial board includes Reginald Ian Barrett, Simon McKeon and Ian Ramsay.

The journal offers coverage of: 
 Company Law
 Takeovers and Public Securities
 Corporate Insolvency
 Corporate Finance
 Securities Industry and Managed Investments
 Current Developments, Legal and Administrative
 Accounting
 Directors' Duties and Corporate Governance
 Overseas Notes: New Zealand, United Kingdom and Europe, United States of America, Canada, Hong Kong, Singapore and Malaysia.

Journal rankings 
The Australian Business Deans Council has given this journal a quality rating of "A". The Australian Research Council has ranked this journal in the "C" tier, although the methodology and utility of such rankings has been challenged by Australian legal scholars and the responsible minister has indicated that this ranking system will be discontinued.

References

External links 
 thomsonreuters.com.au landing page at publisher

Australian law journals
Corporate law